The Secret World of Jeffree Star is an American web series created by YouTuber Shane Dawson. The web series was announced on July 24, 2018, through Dawson's Twitter which immediately attracted the attention of worldwide news outlets. Its premiere debuted August 1, 2018 on Dawson's YouTube channel. The series is presented by Dawson and stars himself and makeup entrepreneur and Internet personality Jeffree Star. Appearances by James Charles, Ryland Adams and Garrett Watts are also featured, with Dawson's film and editing collaborator Andrew Siwicki as camera operator for the duration of the series. The documentary focuses on the life of Jeffree Star, particularly his beginnings as a musician before leaving the industry to focus on his YouTube career and makeup brand.

Cast

Main 
 Shane Dawson: The host and creator of the series who visits Jeffree Star to document him.
 Jeffree Star: He is the subject of the series that focuses on his life, both present and past.
 Nathan Schwandt: Star's then-boyfriend.
 James Charles: A YouTuber make-up artist who prepares and transforms Dawson via makeup to resemble Star; as Dawson tries to live a day in Star's shoes.
 Garrett Watts: He is Dawson's friend and a fellow YouTuber who strikes up a close and intimate friendship with Star.
 Ryland Adams: Dawson's husband (then boyfriend) and a fellow YouTuber
 Andrew Siwicki: He is Dawson's friend and the cameraman who serves as a secondary host of the series.

Episodes

References

External links 
 

2018 web series debuts
YouTube original programming
Shane Dawson